Rothschild's birdwing (Ornithoptera rothschildi) is a large birdwing butterfly, endemic to the Arfak Mountains in Western New Guinea.

What was originally described as Ornithoptera akakeae, is a supposed natural hybrid between Ornithoptera rothschildi and Ornithoptera priamus poseidon.

History

This species was first recognized by entomologist Charles Edgar Pratt and described by George Kenrick in 1911. It was named in honour of Lord Walter Rothschild who financed most of the expeditions of the naturalist Antwerp Edgar Pratt (1850-1924) and his two sons, Carl Brenders Pratt and Felix Biet Pratt, to British New Guinea from 1902–1903 and to the Arfak Mountains of Dutch New Guinea from 1909–1910.

Description
The forewings are dark brown to blackish brown with creamy white to greyish spots. The hindwings rimmed with black scales and have a central patch of golden with black tips. The abdomen has hairy black rings. The forewings of the males are surrounded with black scales and in the central area with blackish, yellowish-green and yellow scales. The hindwings have black scales on the edge. The central patch is yellow with black tips abutting with smaller spots which are coloured lime green. The abdomen is golden.

Rothschild's Birdwing has the most restricted distribution of all birdwings.

References

D'Abrera, B. (1975) Birdwing Butterflies of the World. Country Life Books, London.
Haugum, J. & Low, A.M. 1978-1985. A Monograph of the Birdwing Butterflies. 2 volumes. Scandinavian Press, Klampenborg; 663 pp.
Deslisle, G. (2004) A taxonomic revision of the “birdwing butterflies of paradise”, genus Ornithoptera based on the adult morphology (Lepidoptera, Papilionidae). Lambillionea, 104 (4): 1 - 151.

Gallery

External links

Butterflycorner.net (English/German)
Blue Ornithoptera
Arkive - Rothschild's Birdwing
Entry at Nagypal.net
Consortium for the Barcode of Life Barcode of Life
Pteron Images
Northwestern portion of the island of New Guinea montane rainforest ecoregion

Ornithoptera
Butterflies of Oceania
Lepidoptera of New Guinea
Insects of Western New Guinea
Endemic fauna of Indonesia
Vulnerable fauna of Oceania
Butterflies described in 1911